The National Olympic Committee of the Republic of Moldova ( CNORM) is responsible for Republic of Moldova's participation in the Olympic Games.

History
The National Olympic Committee of the Republic of Moldova was formed in 1991 in Chișinău, and recognized two years later.

See also
Moldova at the Olympics

External links 
Official website

Moldova
Moldova at the Olympics
Olympic
1991 establishments in Moldova